Camilla Clode (born 1 September 1982) is an English television presenter. Since January 2006, she has worked for Sky Sports News and also providing statistical analysis on ITV's The Colour of Money in 2009.

Education
Clode attended St Leonards School in St Andrews before graduating from Oxford Brookes University with a 2:1 in English Studies.

Career
Her initial forays into the world of presenting included hosting a show on Oxford Brookes Radio Station Obsession FM and presenting the Great Big British Quiz for Quiz TV.

She co-hosted The Colour of Money on ITV in early 2009. In July 2010, she presented The Poker Lounge on Channel 4.

Personal life
She married Kingsley Ford in February 2011.

References

External links

Profile - Millie Clode Sky Sports News
Twitter page

1982 births
Living people
Sky Sports presenters and reporters
Television personalities from London
People educated at St Leonards School
Alumni of Oxford Brookes University